Senator Harden may refer to:

Alice Harden (1948–2012), Mississippi State Senate
Clinton Harden (born 1947), New Mexico State Senate
Thomas C. Harden (1856–1925), New York State Senate

Senator Hardin
George A. Hardin (1832–1901), New York State Senate
Martin D. Hardin (1780–1823), U.S. Senator from Kentucky from 1816 to 1817